Rosemary Irene Foot, AO (born 2 April 1936) is a retired Australian politician. She was a Liberal member of the New South Wales Legislative Assembly from 1978 to 1986.

First elected to state parliament as member for Vaucluse at the 1978 state election, Foot went on to serve as Deputy Opposition Leader from 1983 until her retirement in 1986.

Foot was born in Cowra, New South Wales. She is the great-granddaughter of Sir John See, a former New South Wales Premier who successfully introduced the Women's Franchise Act in 1902.

References

 

                   

1936 births
Living people
Liberal Party of Australia members of the Parliament of New South Wales
Members of the New South Wales Legislative Assembly
People from Cowra
Women members of the New South Wales Legislative Assembly
Officers of the Order of Australia